Reginald Arthur Whitcombe (10 April 1898 – 11 January 1957) was an English professional golfer.

Whitcombe began his career at Came Down Golf Club in Dorset and served in the British armed forces during World War I. He was the professional at Parkstone Golf Club from 1 January 1928 until his death in 1957. He finished runner up to Henry Cotton in the 1937 Open Championship at Carnoustie, and in 1938 he won the windswept Open at Royal St George's, where his two final rounds of 75–78 were still enough to beat the halfway leaders by ten strokes. His two older brothers Ernest and Charles were also professional golfers and all three played together for Great Britain in the 1935 Ryder Cup.

Tournament wins
Note: This list is probably incomplete
1922 West of England Professional Championship
1931 West of England Professional Championship
1933 West of England Professional Championship
1934 Penfold-Fairhaven Tournament, Roehampton Invitation, West of England Professional Championship
1936 Irish Open, Dunlop-West of England Tournament
1937 Dunlop-West of England Tournament
1938 Open Championship, News Chronicle Tournament, West of England Professional Championship
1945 Daily Sketch Fourball Tournament (with William Anderson)
1946 Lotus Tournament
1947 Penfold Tournament (tie with Dai Rees and Norman Von Nida)
1948 West of England Professional Championship
1950 West of England Professional Championship

Major championships

Wins (1)

Results timeline

Note: Whitcombe only played in The Open Championship

NT = No tournament
CUT = missed the half-way cut
"T" indicates a tie for a place

Team appearances
Ryder Cup (representing Great Britain): 1935
Seniors vs Juniors (representing the Juniors): 1928
England–Scotland Professional Match (representing England): 1933 (winners), 1934 (winners), 1935 (winners), 1936 (winners), 1937 (winners), 1938 (winners)
Coronation Match (representing the Ladies and Professionals): 1937

References

Further reading

External links

English male golfers
Winners of men's major golf championships
Ryder Cup competitors for Europe
People from Burnham-on-Sea
1898 births
1957 deaths